Landersdale is an unincorporated community in Madison Township, Morgan County, in the U.S. state of Indiana.

History
A post office was established at Landersdale in 1870, and remained in operation until it was discontinued in 1906.

Geography

References

Unincorporated communities in Morgan County, Indiana
Unincorporated communities in Indiana